Various technological revolutions have been defined as successors of the original Industrial Revolution. The sequence includes:

 The first Industrial Revolution
 The Second Industrial Revolution, also known as the Technological Revolution
 The Third Industrial Revolution, better known as the Digital Revolution
 The Fourth Industrial Revolution

See also 

 The Third Industrial Revolution, a 2011 book by economist Jeremy Rifkin